Vadal is a village and petty former princely state on Saurashtra peninsula in Gujarat, western India.

History 
Vadal was a village princely state under a Kamaliya (Ahir) chieftain.
Vadal state prince name is
Darbar shree Raningbapu Surabapu Kamaliya

It had a population of 320 in 1901, yielding a state revenue of 3000 Rupees he was single pricely state  

(mostly from land; 1903-4) and paying 154 Rupees tribute to the Gaekwar Baroda State. 

During the British Raj, the petty state in Gohelwar prant was under the colonial Eastern Kathiawar Agency.

External links 
 DSAL.UChicago - Kathiawar

Princely states of Gujarat
Villages in Junagadh district